Jude Michael Waddy (born September 12, 1975) is a former professional American football linebacker who played for two seasons for the Green Bay Packers. He was signed by the Packers as an undrafted free agent in 1998. He played college football at William & Mary. Waddy also played one season for the Berlin Thunder of NFL Europe and the San Diego Chargers of the NFL.

Post Football
Waddy lives in Brooklyn, NY and is the founder of PhysiPet LLC, which designs, manufactures, and assembles pet toys.

References

1975 births
Living people
People from Washington, D.C.
Players of American football from Washington, D.C.
American football linebackers
William & Mary Tribe football players
Green Bay Packers players
Berlin Thunder players
San Diego Chargers players